Delilah Cotto  is a Puerto Rican-American actress, dancer and model.

Early life
Cotto was born and raised in the Coney Island section of Brooklyn, New York to Puerto Rican parents. She studied drama at the High School of Performing Arts in New York City under Anthony Abeson, She trained at the William Esper Studio (with Suzanne Esper) and at Carnegie Hall in a Master class with Wynn Handman. She also studied dance at STEPS and BROADWAY DANCE CENTER and Phil Black Dance Studios IN NYC

Career
After studying dance, she was given a small role in Lean on Me. After being away from acting she made an appearance in Law & Order. She was later featured in films Girl 6 and Personals. In 2002, Cotto had her first starring role in the feature film Empire playing John Leguizamo's girlfriend Carmen.  She starred in the television series Kingpin until its cancellation in 2004.  She was featured in Cinemax's short film entitled Stories of Lost Souls alongside James Gandolfini. Her other film credits include Splinter, Broken Circle, Rockaway and Illegal Tender and currently JERSEY BRED

She has also made guest appearances on many television shows (such as Trinity, Oz, CSI: Miami and Cuts), has performed in an off-Broadway entitled "Cloud Tectonics" in the role of Celestina Del Sol, and has appeared on the cover of popular magazines (such as Open Your Eyes (OYE) twice, Tinta Latina and Profile).

In 1995 she featured in the music video Billie Jean of the German punk band The Bates.

Filmography

Film

Television

See also
Nuyorican — Puerto Rican diaspora in New York City

References

External links
 Official Website
 
 
 

Living people
20th-century American actresses
21st-century American actresses
Actresses from New York City
American film actresses
American television actresses
American people of Puerto Rican descent
Year of birth missing (living people)
Puerto Rican culture in New York City
People from Coney Island
American female dancers
Female models from New York (state)